The Henry and Charles Imig Block is a historic two-story building in Sheboygan, Wisconsin. It was built in 1881-1882 by masons Luecke & Roeder and carpenter Fred Hildebrand, and it was designed in the Italianate style by architect Charles Hilpertshauser. The building was initially a clothing and boot store run by the Imig brothers, whose father was an immigrant from Germany. The building has been listed on the National Register of Historic Places since July 9, 1998.

References

1882 establishments in Wisconsin
Buildings and structures completed in 1882
Italianate architecture in Wisconsin
National Register of Historic Places in Sheboygan County, Wisconsin